Fox Portugal (marketed and commonly known as Fox) is a Portuguese pay television channel. It broadcasts syndicated TV shows such as  Blindspot, The Americans , The Equalizer, Nikita , Dexter, FBI, FBI Most Wanted, FBI International, The Walking Dead, The Simpsons, and NCIS: Los Angeles. It is owned by Walt Disney Company. Its main competitor is AXN.

Shows
 Agents of S.H.I.E.L.D.
 Alaska Daily
 American Dad!
 The Americans
 Angel
 Bones (Ossos)
 Blindspot
 Scandal
 Burn Notice (Espião Fora-de-Jogo)
 Californication
 The Chicago Code
 The Cleaner
 The Cleveland Show
 Dexter
 Family Guy
 FBI
 FBI Most Wanted
 FBI International
 Fire Country
 The Finder
 Flashpoint
 The Forgotten
 The Glades
 Hawaii Five-0 (Hawai: Força Especial)
 Homeland (Segurança Nacional)
 House
 How I Met Your Mother (Foi Assim que Aconteceu) (formerly on Fox Life)
 It's Always Sunny in Philadelphia (Nunca Chove em Filadélfia) (formerly on FX)
 The Killing
 Lie to Me
 Major Crimes (Crimes Graves)
 Modern Family (Uma Família Muito Moderna)
 NCIS Hawaii
 NCIS: Los Angeles (Investigação Criminal: Los Angeles)
 Nikita
 Persons Unknown (Desconhecidos)
 SEAL Team
 Shameless (No Limite)
 The Simpsons (Os Simpsons)
 Smallville
 Touch
 The Walking Dead
 The Equalizer
 White Collar (Apanha-me se Puderes)

External links
  

Television stations in Portugal
Television channels and stations established in 2003
Portuguese-language television stations